A Child's Wish is a 1997 American made-for-television drama film based on actual events. John Ritter stars as a father of a terminally ill 16-year-old girl portrayed by Anna Chlumsky.

Plot
Ritter portrays Ed Chandler, a father who is fired from his job for taking time off to tend to his 16-year-old daughter Missy (Chlumsky), who is battling cancer. Rather than accepting his dismissal, Ed decides to fight back. With the help of a United States senator, he lobbies the United States Congress and is the stimulus to passage of the Family and Medical Leave Act. Because Missy's cancer is life-threatening, she is visited by the Make-A-Wish Foundation, and she wishes to go to the White House, visit the Oval Office, and hopefully see President Bill Clinton. Although Make-A-Wish is not so sure if they can grant her wish, in the end she does in fact get to visit the Oval Office and meet President Bill Clinton, playing himself in a cameo appearance.

Missy is based on the merging of two women, Melissa Weaver and Dixie Yandle. Ed Chandler's character is very closely related to George Yandle, who with his wife Vicki, helped push the Family Medical Leave Act through Congress after being fired from their jobs to care for their daughter Dixie who was suffering with cancer. In real life, Vicki Yandle was on stage with President Clinton when the law was signed.

Cast
John Ritter as Ed Chandler 
Tess Harper as Joanna Chandler 
Anna Chlumsky as Missy Chandler 
Sarah Chalke as Melinda 
Karl David-Djerf as Scott 
Kevin McNulty as Robbie 
President Bill Clinton as himself 
David Lewis as Rick 
Janine Cox as Karen 
Aurelio Dinunzio as Hank 
Merrilyn Gann as Dr. Cross 
Eva De Viveiros as Jenny 
Freda Perry as Lucille 
Michael St. John Smith as Bailey 
Teryl Rothery as Donna

References

External links

http://www.hollywood.com/movie/A_Childs_Wish/6152737

1997 television films
1997 films
1997 drama films
American films based on actual events
Films directed by Waris Hussein
CBS network films
American drama television films
1990s American films